István Németh (born November 16, 1979) is a retired Hungarian professional basketball player.

Hungarian national team
Németh was a member of the Hungarian national team at the EuroBasket 1999.

See also
 List of foreign basketball players in Serbia

External links
 István Németh at esake.gr
 István Németh at legabasket.it
 István Németh at euroleague.net

1979 births
Living people
ABA League players
AEK B.C. players
BC Körmend players
Hungarian expatriate basketball people in Greece
Hungarian expatriate basketball people in Italy
Hungarian expatriate basketball people in Poland
Hungarian expatriate basketball people in Serbia
Hungarian expatriate basketball people in Spain
Hungarian men's basketball players
KK Vojvodina Srbijagas players
Menorca Bàsquet players
Pallacanestro Treviso players
People from Körmend
Shooting guards
Szolnoki Olaj KK players
Asseco Gdynia players
Sportspeople from Vas County